() is a trans-Neptunian object in the scattered disc, located in the outermost region of the Solar System, that measures approximately  in diameter. It was discovered on 25 January 2014, by astronomers with the Pan-STARRS survey at Haleakala Observatory on the island of Maui, Hawaii, in the United States.

Orbit and classification 

 belongs to the gravitationally perturbed population of scattered disc objects, which, at their closest approaches, come close to Neptune's orbit at 30 AU, but their farthest distances reach many times of that.

It orbits the Sun at a distance of 34.3–77.6 AU once every 418 years and 2 months (152,739 days; semi-major axis of 55.92 AU). Its orbit has an eccentricity of 0.39 and an inclination of 9° with respect to the ecliptic. The body's observation arc begins with its first observation taken by the Sloan Digital Sky Survey on 12 March 2005.

Numbering and naming 

This minor planet was numbered by the Minor Planet Center on 5 February 2020 and has not yet received a name.

Physical characteristics

Diameter and albedo 

Using an absolute magnitude of 4.3 from the Asteroids—Dynamic Site, and assuming an albedo in the range of 0.05 to 0.25, the object's mean-diameter may be as low as 370, and as high as 820 kilometers. Johnstonss Archive assumes a similar albedo of 0.9 and calculates a diameter of 671 kilometers using an absolute magnitude of 4.1.

References

External links 
 List Of Centaurs and Scattered-Disk Objects, Minor Planet Center
 Discovery Circumstances: Numbered Minor Planets (1)-(5000) – Minor Planet Center
 
 

543354
543354
543354
20140125